Ben Chavis may refer to:

 Ben Chavis (educator), American educator and controversial education reform advocate
 Benjamin Chavis, African-American civil rights activist (born 1948)

See also